Al Tuck (born December 23, 1966), is a Canadian songwriter and folksinger from Prince Edward Island who has spent much of his career based in Halifax, Nova Scotia.

Early life
Tuck was born in Summerside, Prince Edward Island, the son of editorial cartoonist and Anglican cleric Canon Robert Tuck. Tuck attended the University of King's College in Halifax, Nova Scotia, and began appearing in Halifax coffeehouses and college pubs, either as a solo performer or with his first couple of bands, namely The Columbia Recording Artists and The Bluegrass Lawnmower.

Career
Tuck's formation of the punningly named trio Al Tuck and No Action coincided with increased attention on the burgeoning Halifax independent music scene in the early 1990s. This led Tuck to a recording deal with Murderecords, the boutique music label managed by Halifax pop act Sloan, as well as a nomination for an East Coast Music Award and an appearance at Lollapalooza.

Tuck's song "Buddah" is featured on the soundtrack of the Bob Dylan-themed documentary Complete Unknown.

Tuck released Food for the Moon in 2009. In a review, Now magazine wrote, "Tuck's voice – thin, rough-hewn, distinct – reaches out intimately, and his songwriting never drops beneath top-shelf."

In 2010, Tuck was the voice of Milkman Cat in the Spike Jonze-produced animated short, Higglety-Pigglety Pop!.

"Under Your Shadow" followed in 2011 under the Maple Music label. The album appeared on the !earshot Campus and Community National Top 50 Albums chart in January 2012.

In June 2013, Tuck's studio album Stranger at the Wake was longlisted for the 2013 Polaris Music Prize. Fair Country, which is a mix of original songs, co-written with poet Alex Rettie, and covers, was released digitally in 2015 and then in CD format in 2016.

December 2016 saw release of a tribute album, featuring 15 of Tuck's songs, performed by 15 of his musical friends, and produced by Adam Gallant and Andrew Murray of Charlottetown, PEI.  Two of these songs, "In the Days When the People Were Small and Few" and "Behind that Big Red Curtain", were not previously recorded by Tuck.

Personal life
Tuck was formerly married (and divorced in 2010) to singer Catherine MacLellan, daughter of renowned P.E.I. songwriter Gene MacLellan. They have one daughter, Isabel.

Discography 
 Arhoolie (1994) 
 Brave Last Days (1994)  
The New High Road of Song (2001) 
Live at the Rebecca Cohn (2002)  
My Blues Away (2005) 
 Food for the Moon (2009) 
All Time Favourites (2010 compilation) 
Under Your Shadow (2011) 
Stranger at the Wake (2013)
Fair Country  (2016)

References

External links 
 

1966 births
Living people
People from Summerside, Prince Edward Island
Canadian folk singer-songwriters
Canadian country singer-songwriters
Canadian male singer-songwriters
Musicians from Halifax, Nova Scotia
Murderecords artists
Musicians from Prince Edward Island
University of King's College alumni